Sanele Nohamba (born 19 January 1999) is a South African professional rugby union player for the  in United Rugby Championship and the Currie Cup. His regular position is scrum-half.

Nohamba represented South Africa Schools 'A' in 2016, South Africa Schools in 2017 and South Africa Under-20 at the 2019 World Rugby Under 20 Championship, where he scored 33 points through two tries, seven conversions and three penalties.

Nohamba made his Currie Cup debut for the Sharks in July 2019, coming on as a replacement scrum-half in their opening match of the 2019 season against .

References

External links
 

South African rugby union players
Living people
1999 births
People from Raymond Mhlaba Local Municipality
Rugby union scrum-halves
Sharks (Currie Cup) players
South Africa Under-20 international rugby union players
Sharks (rugby union) players
Rugby union players from the Eastern Cape
Golden Lions players
Lions (United Rugby Championship) players